Pete List is a New York City-based musician and animator.

Animation
List has done animation work for Celebrity Deathmatch, Gary & Mike, and Doug. Also included on his resume are ID's and promos for companies like MTV, VH1 and Nickelodeon. He directed the Marilyn Manson music video for "Astonishing Panorama of the Endtimes". His latest work has focused on children's videos for Scholastic & Weston Woods Studios.

Music
List is a multi-instrumentalist, primarily known for his beatboxing for Middle Eastern-influenced music. He is a member of Beatbox Guitar with Rob Mastrianni, and Djinn with Carmine Guida, and has toured various countries with these acts. His music with Djinn has featured on the Istanbul episode of Anthony Bourdain's No Reservations.

Partial discography
 Songs for Kassar

References

American animators
Living people
Musicians from New York City
Year of birth missing (living people)